Grupo Desportivo Sourense is a Portuguese football club based in Soure. Founded in 1947, it currently competes in the Coimbra FA Division of Honour, holding home games at Campo António Coelho Rodrigues, with a 1,500 capacity.

Recent Seasons

Honours
Terceira Divisão
2012–13
Coimbra Regional League
1986–87; 1990–91; 2016–17

Coaches 
 Paulo Neves (2004–2005)
 José Viterbo (2005–2007)
 Rui Carlos (2007–2008)
 Ricardo Namora (2008–2009)
 Nuno Raquete (2009–2015)
 Rafael Silva (2015–)

Supporters Groups 
 Fúria Negra – since 2006

External links 
 Official Facebook Page
 Supporter Group Page

Football clubs in Portugal
Association football clubs established in 1947
1947 establishments in Portugal